Mihail Silistraru is a Moldovan politician.

Biography 

He was a member of the Parliament of Moldova.

External links 
 Site-ul Parlamentului Republicii Moldova
 Alianţa Moldova Noastră

References

1951 births
Living people
Our Moldova Alliance politicians
Moldovan MPs 2009